In Japanese art, mitate-e is a subgenre of ukiyo-e that employs allusions, puns, and incongruities, often to parody classical art or events.

The term derives from two roots: mitateru ("to liken one thing to another") and e ("picture").  The mitate technique arose first in poetry and became prominent during the Heian period (794–1185).  Haiku poets revived the technique during the Edo period (1603–1868), from which it spread to the other arts of the era.  Such works typically employ allusions, puns, and incongruities, and frequently recall classical artworks.

In the context of ukiyo-e, mitate-e is often translated into English as "parody picture".  This usage of the term arose much later; the term itself was used in different ways during the Edo period.  Those works today called mitate-e used different labels at the time, such as fūryū ("elegant" or "fashionable") which appeared frequently in the 18th century on works by Okumura Masanobu (1686–1764) and Suzuki Harunobu (1725–1770).

Notes

References

Works cited

External links
 

Arts in Japan